

The ChordPro (also known as Chord) is an ASCII text file format for transcribing songs with chords and lyrics.

The format was originally used for guitar, but is used for variety of other string instruments, such as ukulele, bass guitar or mandolin.

Although this format is legible as it is, there are many popular programs for displaying, transposing and printing.

Files in this format often have extensions such as  .crd, .chopro, .pro, .chordpro  or .cho.

The newest version of the format is v6.

Basic Input Format
ChordPro file format contains chords in square brackets within song lyrics:

What [Em]child is [G]this, who, [D]laid to rest
On [Em]Mary's [Am]lap, is [B]sleeping?
Whom [Em]angels [G]greet with [D]anthems sweet,
While [Em]shepherds [B]watch are [Esus]keep[Em]ing?

Programs convert this format to:

        Em          G           D 
What 	child is 	this, who, 	laid to rest

    Em      Am 	        B 
On 	Mary's 	lap, is 	sleeping?

        Em 	    G 	        D 
Whom 	angels 	greet with 	anthems sweet,

        Em 	        B 	        Esus 	Em 
While 	shepherds 	watch are 	keep	ing?

Output often significantly varies by program, software platform, output media etc.

Directives
ChordPro format allows users to mark sections of a song, such as Title, Subtitle, Key, Time, Chorus etc. through special keywords enclosed by curly brackets ({ and }) called directives. Some directives change the output, while others are not displayed and are primarily used to keep track of meta-data.

{title: What Child Is This?} 
{subtitle: Traditional Christmas Song}
{key: Em}
{lyricist: William Dix, 1837-1898}
{composer: GREENSLEEVES, a 17th Century English Air}
{time: 6/8}
{ccli: 2766502}
# This song is believed to be in the public domain. More information can be found at:
#   http://www.pdinfo.com/PD-Music-Genres/PD-Christmas-Songs.php
#   http://www.ccli.com/Licenseholder/Search/SongSearch.aspx?s=2766502

History

In June 1991 Martin Leclerc and Mario Dorion created the Chord program and source file notation format.
For several years there was no active development of the software.
In 2007 Johan Vromans and Adam Monsen revived the project under a new name Chordii, supporting ChordPro format version 4. 
In 2015 Johan Vromans started yet another re-write of the tool and called it ChordPro. This release supports ChordPro format version 5 and is in active development.

References

External links
 ChordPro.org -- main website for the format.
 ChordPro Project on GitHub
 User Forum on Groups.io
 Chordii -- a legacy release of Chord utility, supporting version 4.

Music notation file formats